Bump City is the second album by the soul/funk group Tower of Power. The album cover is derived from a sketch by David Garibaldi. It's also their first album for Warner Bros. Records. With Rufus Miller now gone, Rick Stevens took the reins as the sole lead vocalist for this album.

Track listing 
All songs written by Emilio Castillo and Stephen "Doc" Kupka unless otherwise noted.

 "You Got to Funkifize" - 4:31
 "What Happened to the World That Day?" - 4:11
 "Flash in the Pan" - 3:34
 "Gone (in Memory of Jacqueline Mesquite)" (Greg Adams, Skip Mesquite) - 3:41
 "You Strike My Main Nerve" (Kupka, Castillo, L. Williams, L. Gordon) - 2:52
 "Down to the Nightclub" (Kupka, Castillo, David Garibaldi) - 2:43
 "You're Still a Young Man" - 5:35
 "Skating on Thin Ice" - 3:48
 "Of the Earth" - 4:30

Personnel 
 Rick Stevens - lead vocals
 Skip Mesquite - first tenor saxophone, flute, vocals (lead on "Gone")
 Emilio Castillo - second tenor saxophone, vocals 
 Greg Adams - trumpet, flugelhorn (solo on "Gone"), French horn, piano (on "Gone"), vocals
 Stephen "Doc" Kupka - baritone saxophone, vocals
 Mic Gillette - trumpet, trombone, French horn, vocals
 Willie James Fulton - guitar, vocals
 David Garibaldi - drums
 Francis Rocco Prestia - bass
 Brent Byars - conga drums, vocals
 Jay Spell - piano (on "What Happened to the World That Day", "You're Still a Young Man" and "Of the Earth")
 Memphis Strings - arranged and conducted by Greg Adams on "What Happened to the World That Day?", "You're Still a Young Man" and "Of the Earth"
Technical
Ron Capone, Steve Cropper - mixing

Charts 
Albums - Billboard (United States) 

Singles - Billboard (United States)

References

1972 albums
Tower of Power albums
Warner Records albums